Tusker Rock, is a rock in the Bristol Channel, about  west of Ogmore-by-Sea, Vale of Glamorgan, Wales. It is suggested that it takes its name from Tuska the Viking, a Dane whose fellow Vikings semi-colonised the Vale of Glamorgan.
Alternatively, the name might derive (as with the similarly named Tuskar Rock, Ireland  and various other Tusker Rocks in the Bristol Channel and Milford Haven/Skomer area) simply from the Old Norse tu (large) skar (rock).

It is fully visible only at low tide, and was formerly a notorious hazard for ships.

Today, the waters around Tusker Rock are a popular diving location.

References

External links 
Virtual Tour at low tide
Tusker Rock's shipwrecks graveyard captured in art project

Islands of Bridgend County Borough
Islands of the Bristol Channel
Uninhabited islands of Wales